Jordanian Bengali Pidgin Arabic is an Arabic pidgin spoken in Jordan. The pidgin was formed from contact between the Jordanian Arabic and Bengali languages.

See also 
 Arabic-based creole languages

Further reading

References

Arabic-based pidgins and creoles
Languages of Jordan